The Cherwell School is a secondary school with academy status on the Marston Ferry Road in Oxford, England. The current school site was built in 1963 as a secondary modern school, later becoming the main comprehensive school for North Oxford, with a catchment area extending down to the city centre, Grandpont, and New Hinksey. Along with later expansions, in 2003, and as part of a citywide reorganisation, it merged with the Frideswide Middle School, and is now a split site school of 1,700 pupils aged between 11 and 19.

Recent changes
The North site has recently undergone construction work, with the extension of the Sixth form common room. The original design, to accommodate only 100 pupils in years 12 and 13, became inadequate in recent years for the 300 or more pupils currently in the sixth form.

The main building work was construction of a new building alongside the existing block, and then removing the internal wall to create a much larger space. On the second floor of the structure, the school library has been extended to include quiet study areas, each with computer and desk facilities.

Notable alumni
Cherwell School alumni are called Cherwellians:

Tom Bateman, actor. 
Joey Beauchamp, footballer.
Sholto Carnegie, rower
Canice Carroll, footballer
Mark Crozer, musician.
Hannah England, middle-distance runner and World Championship 1500m silver medallist.
Rupert Friend, actor.
Tim Goldsworthy, Record Producer, DJ and co-founder of Mo'Wax record label.
Ramin Gray, playwright.
Orlando Higginbottom, also known as Totally Enormous Extinct Dinosaurs, Electro Producer and DJ.
Benjamin Hope, painter.
Adam Hunt, chess International Master.
James Lavelle, member of music group UNKLE, founder of Mo'Wax record label.
Yasmin Le Bon née Yasmin Parvaneh, model and wife of Simon Le Bon, singer in band Duran Duran.
Jack Letts, jihadist.
Michael Morris, cricketer
Tom Penny, skateboarder.
Omid Scobie, journalist and writer.
Rachel Seiffert, novelst
Sophie Sumner, model.
Miles Welch-Hayes, footballer - Oxford United

References

External links
Cherwell School website
Cherwell School Parent Teacher Association website
Exam league table results for Cherwell School, 2006  and results from 2005 
Ofsted inspection report (carried out in 2005)
Ofsted inspection report (carried out in 2008)

Secondary schools in Oxfordshire
Educational institutions established in 1963
Schools in Oxford
1963 establishments in England
Academies in Oxfordshire